Richard L Bond is an American businessman. He is the former President and CEO of Tyson Foods, Inc. (TSN).

Biography

Early life
Richard Bond graduated from Elizabethtown College, where he received a Bachelor of Science in Business Administration.

Career
He became President of IBP, Inc., a Midwestern hog and cattle slaughtering giant, which was in 2001 acquired by Tyson Foods. He was appointed Co-Chief Operating Officer and Group President, Fresh Meats and Retail, - an appointment the Wall Street Journal described as intended to reassure investors, and then became President and Chief Operating Officer in 2003. Mr. Bond worked under Don Tyson's son, John H. Tyson, until 2006, when Mr. Bond was rewarded with the CEO job. While CEO of Tyson Foods in 2008, he earned a total compensation of  $4,777,807, which included a base salary of $1,251,204; options granted of $2,610,000; and other compensation of $916,603. He left Tyson Foods on January 5, 2009, reportedly amidst tensions with Don Tyson. He had reported in November 2008 that Tyson's finances were worsening. Industry observers said that Bond, who has a reputation as a cost cutter, debated with Mr. Tyson, who is said to more aggressively seek market share, over whether to cut chicken production to improve prices.

References

Living people
Elizabethtown College alumni
American chief executives of food industry companies
Tyson Foods people
Year of birth missing (living people)